Enid is a feminine given name. Its origin is Middle Welsh eneit, meaning 'spirit; life; purity' (from Proto-Celtic *ana-ti̯o-, compare Gaulish anatia 'souls (?)' attested on the Larzac tablet, ultimately from the Proto-Indo-European root *h₂enh₁- 'to breathe, blow'; compare the modern Welsh word anadl 'breath; wind').

Enid was the Celtic goddess and Arthurian name of the 19th century following Alfred Lord Tennyson's Arthurian epic Idylls of the King (1859) and its medieval Welsh source, the Mabinogi tale of Geraint and Enid.

Enid drifted into popular use in Britain in the 1890s, becoming most popular in the 1920s. Then it was the greatest possible compliment to be called a "second Enid", since the original was a legendary romantic figure of spotless perfection and courage in life. Enid was the quiet, brave, steadfast character of Tennyson's poem, loved deeply by many, yet her love or loyalty to her husband was unwavering, even at his worst.

People

 Enid Dame (1943–2003), American poet
 Enid Luff (born 1935), Welsh musician
 Enid Wyn Jones (1909–1967), Welsh nurse
 Enid Morgan, Welsh former international lawn and indoor bowls competitor
 Enid MacRobbie (born 1931), Scottish plant scientist
 Enid Riddell (1903–1980), British socialite and racing driver
 Enid Marx (1902–1998), English painter and designer
 Enid Stacy (1868–1903), English socialist activist
 Enid Bagnold (1889–1981), British author and playwright
 Enid Bakewell (born 1940), English cricketer
 Enid Bennett (1893–1969), Australian-born American silent film actress
 Enid Blyton (1897–1968), British children's writer
 Enid Campbell (1932–2010), Australian legal scholar and law professor
 Enid Derham (1882–1941), Australian poet and academic
 Enid Evans (1914–2011), New Zealand librarian
 Enid Greene (born 1958), American politician
 Enid A. Haupt (1906–2005), American publisher and philanthropist
 Enid Kent, played Nurse Bigelow, a recurring character in the television series M*A*S*H
 Enid Bosworth Lorimer (1887–1982), Australian actress and director
 Enid Charles (1894–1972), British socialist, feminist and statistician
 Enid Mark (1932–2008), American editor and publisher
 Enid Legros-Wise (born 1943), Canadian ceramic artist
 Enid Lyons (1897–1981), Australian politician and wife of Prime Minister Joseph Lyons
 Enid Markey (1894–1981), American actress
 Enid Johnson Macleod (1909–2001), Canadian anaesthetist, medical doctor and academic
 Enid MacRobbie (born 1931), Scottish plant scientist
 Enid Mumford (1924–2006), British professor largely known for her work on human factors and socio-technical systems
 Enid Nemy, reporter and columnist for The New York Times
 Enid Diana Rigg (1938–2020), English actress
 Enid Lapthorn (1889–1967), British politician 
 Enid Starkie (1897–1970), Irish literary critic
 Enid Stamp Taylor (1904–1946), English actress
 Enid Yandell (1870–1934), American sculptor
 Enid Tahirović (born 1972), Bosnian handball goalkeeper
 Enid Kent (born 1945), American former television actress
 Enid Shomer, American poet
 Enid Gilchrist, Australian fashion designer
 Enid Bishop (born 1925), Australian librarian
 Enid Lakeman (1903–1995), British political reformer, writer and politician
 Enid Crow (born 1968), American feminist artist
 Enid Hibbard(1889–1960), American screenwriter
 Enid Greene Mickelsen (born 1958), American politician 
 Enid Hattersley (1904–2001), British politician 
 Enid Tapsell (1903–1975), New Zealander nurse, community leader, writer and local politician
 Enid Szánthó (1907–1997), Hungarian opera singer

Fictional characters
 Enid, a character in OK K.O.! Let's Be Heroes
 Enid, a character in The Walking Dead
 "Enid", a Barenaked Ladies song
 Enid or "Enide" (an Old French variant of Enid), a heroine in Arthurian legends
 Enid, great-aunt of Neville Longbottom from J. K. Rowling's Harry Potter series
E nid an Gleanna (Daisy of the Valleys), an alias of Francesca Findabair, a character in The Witcher saga by Polish author Andrzej Sapkowski.
 Enid Coleslaw, the lead character of the 1997 comic book Ghost World and its 2001 film adaptation
 Tracy Enid Flick, character in the 1998 novel Election and 1999 film portrayed by Reese Witherspoon
 Enid Frick, editor of Vogue magazine on TV's Sex and the City
 Enid Wexler, a feminist law student in the movie Legally Blonde (2001)
 Enid Kelso, character in TV's Scrubs
 Enid Nightshade, a character in The Worst Witch series of children's books
 Enid Rollins, a best friend of twin in the Sweet Valley High and Sweet Valley University book series and TV show.
 Enid Sinclair, a supporting eccentric werewolf character in Wednesday (2022)

Places 
 Enid, city in Oklahoma
 Enid Lake, lake in Mississippi
 Enid Lake, small lake in Oregon on Mount Hood, popular with snowshoers

References 

English feminine given names
Welsh feminine given names